Occupational justice is a particular category of social justice related to the intrinsic need for humans to explore and act on their environments in ways that provide healthy levels of intellectual stimulation, and allow for personal care and safety, subsistence, pleasure, and social participation.

The originators of the concept, social scientists and occupational therapists Ann Wilcock of Australia and Elizabeth Townsend of Canada, maintain that abundant research in the social and behavioral sciences demonstrates the adverse consequences of isolation, sensory deprivation, unemployment, incarceration, alienation, and boredom, suggesting that the denial of opportunities to engage in purposeful activities necessary for health and well-being creates a type of social injustice, or occupational deprivation, which has been termed "occupational injustice."  Contemplating a utopian vision of an 'occupationally just' world, the originators of the concept note that while "social justice addresses the social relations and social conditions of life, occupational justice addresses what people do in their relationships and conditions for living" (p. 84).

References

External links 

Occupational therapy
Justice
Workplace